Del Rio (Spanish: Del Río, meaning "Of The River") is a census-designated place (CDP) in Stanislaus County, California, United States that is located around the Del Rio Country Club. The population was 1,270 at the 2010 census, up from 1,168 at the 2000 census. It is part of the Modesto Metropolitan Statistical Area.

Geography
Del Rio is located at  (37.746449, -121.011604).

Demographics

2010
The 2010 United States Census reported that Del Rio had a population of 1,270. The racial makeup of Del Rio was 1,027 (80.9%) White, 25 (2.0%) African American, 5 (0.4%) Native American, 143 (11.3%) Asian, 1 (0.1%) Pacific Islander, 27 (2.1%) from other races, and 42 (3.3%) from two or more races. Hispanic or Latino of any race were 107 persons (8.4%).

The Census reported that 1,270 people (100% of the population) lived in households, 0 (0%) lived in non-institutionalized group quarters, and 0 (0%) were institutionalized.

There were 485 households, out of which 144 (29.7%) had children under the age of 18 living in them, 359 (74.0%) were opposite-sex married couples living together, 27 (5.6%) had a female householder with no husband present, 12 (2.5%) had a male householder with no wife present.  There were 14 (2.9%) unmarried opposite-sex partnerships, and 1 (0.2%) same-sex married couples or partnerships. 72 households (14.8%) were made up of individuals, and 40 (8.2%) had someone living alone who was 65 years of age or older. The average household size was 2.62.  There were 398 families (82.1% of all households); the average family size was 2.89.

The population was spread out, with 254 people (20.0%) under the age of 18, 72 people (5.7%) aged 18 to 24, 175 people (13.8%) aged 25 to 44, 523 people (41.2%) aged 45 to 64, and 246 people (19.4%) who were 65 years of age or older.  The median age was 50.6 years. For every 100 females, there were 96.3 males.  For every 100 females age 18 and over, there were 94.3 males.

The homeowner vacancy rate was 3.0%; the rental vacancy rate was 5.9%.  1,187 people (93.5% of the population) lived in owner-occupied housing units and 83 people (6.5%) lived in rental housing units.

2000
As of the census of 2000, there were 1,168 people, 407 households, and 361 families residing in the CDP. The racial makeup of the CDP was 85.27% White, 1.63% African American, 0.51% Native American, 8.13% Asian, 2.14% from other races, and 2.31% from two or more races. Hispanic or Latino of any race were 6.25% of the population.

There were 407 households, out of which 35.9% had children under the age of 18 living with them, 80.8% were married couples living together, 5.2% had a female householder with no husband present, and 11.3% were non-families. 9.6% of all households were made up of individuals, and 6.4% had someone living alone who was 65 years of age or older.  The average household size was 2.87 and the average family size was 3.04.

In the CDP, the population was spread out, with 26.1% under the age of 18, 4.9% from 18 to 24, 19.2% from 25 to 44, 33.8% from 45 to 64, and 16.0% who were 65 years of age or older.  The median age was 45 years. For every 100 females, there were 95.3 males.  For every 100 females age 18 and over, there were 92.6 males.

The median income for a household in the CDP was $108,285, and the median income for a family was $134,354. Males had a median income of $0 versus $31,100 for females. The per capita income for the CDP was $60,837.  About 2.7% of families and 3.0% of the population were below the poverty line, including 5.8% of those under age 18 and none of those age 65 or over.

Planning functions
Del Rio has been subject to a number of planning activities, beginning with the 1992 analysis by Stanislaus County regarding the projected growth impacts of this area. This plan, an integral part of the county General Plan, emphasized a continuation of the low density development of the Del Rio area, with balanced uses based upon the historic residential, agricultural and open space precedent land uses.  The plan included prioritization of high quality residential development and the undergrounding of all utility infrastructure.

In regard to environmental factors the 1992 plan called for extensive protection of riparian zones along the Stanislaus River.  The plan also analyzed air quality impacts of future land development and transportation change; these studies were carried out in a companion document prepared by Earthmetrics, and these analyses were used to size the future roadway system and intersection controls.

Government

Notable people
None

References

Census-designated places in Stanislaus County, California
Census-designated places in California